NKVD buildings in former Soviet Union - during the first years of the Soviet Union the NKVD took over a number of existing buildings, many building were also constructed for offices and investigation/torture chambers and internal prisons.

Russia

Moscow
Lubyanka (KGB), formerly All-Russia Insurance Company, rebuild 1940 and 1983

Saint Petersburg
Bolshoi Dom at Liteynyi Prospect

Vladivostok
Far Eastern National University Main Building, NKVD 1939-1956

Kyiv, Ukraine
now the Cabinet of Ministers of Ukraine 
October Palace of Culture, originally a "Seminary for Young ladies"

Minsk, Belarus
now KGB building, constructed after the war, see

Baku, Azerbaijan
now the State Frontier Service

NKVD
Buildings and structures built in the Soviet Union